Peraji is a small settlement in the City Municipality of Koper in the Littoral region of Slovenia.

It lies close to the border with Croatia and is not connected by road to any surrounding settlements. It no longer has any permanent residents.

References

External links
Peraji on Geopedia

Populated places in the City Municipality of Koper